Hope Valley is a broad mountain valley in Alpine County, California, located on the eastern slope of the Sierra Nevada to the northeast of Carson Pass and south of Lake Tahoe. The valley served as a major thoroughfare for the passage of settlers and emigrants to and from California during the Gold Rush era.

Geography

From this point, the valley carries the river north for several miles before making a wide turn to the east. About a mile and a half east of the turn, just before reaching Sorensen's Resort, the wide valley abruptly narrows, and a steep V-shaped canyon carries the river further downstream toward the Nevada deserts.

The tallest of these peaks are Freel Peak, Job's Sister, and Jobs Peak, all three of which are located on the same ridge some distance to the northeast. Six additional named peaks also loom over Hope Valley: Hawkins Peak and Pickett Peak to the southeast, in the corner formed by the river's eastward bend; Red Lake Peak and Stevens Peak to the southwest, guarding the north side of Carson Pass; and Waterhouse Peak and Thompson Peak flanking both sides of Luther Pass to the northwest.

Hope Valley is well connected to the California state highway network. California State Route 88 follows the course of the valley from southwest to northeast, extending further westward over Carson Pass and northeastward down Woodfords Canyon toward the Carson Valley. State Route 89 enters the valley through Luther Pass to the north, and intersects SR 88 at Pickett's Junction. Regular snowplow patrols keep both highways open year round, only closing in the event of particularly heavy snowstorms.

History

Hope Valley was historically inhabited by the Northern Washoe people, whose traditional homeland centered around Lake Tahoe and extended into the mountains to the south and west, and the desert valleys and ranges to the east. Every winter, a group of Northern Washoes would travel through the valley by snowshoe along a trail they called Pewećeli Yeweš. First they would cross westward to reach the western slope of the Sierra Nevada, where they would harvest salmon from the American River. Then, after smoking the salmon to preserve it for their return journey, they would retrace their steps eastward to bring the salmon to their compatriots overwintering in the desert to the east of Hope Valley.

In the summer of 1848, the soldiers of a Mormon Battalion detachment gave the valley its English name. These Mormons were returning to Utah after completing their service in the Mexican–American War. The soldiers were in poor spirits after three of their men had been killed in an incident about a month before at Tragedy Spring, across Carson Pass to the west. When they saw the valley, "[their] spirits revived when they arrived in sight of it." Thus they christened the newfound valley "Hope Valley". Henry W. Bigler, a soldier in the battalion, wrote that they "campt [sic] at the head of what we called Hope Valley as we began to have hope." Analogously, in 1855, surveyors christened two similar valleys to the south as "Faith Valley" and "Charity Valley", in reference to the three theological virtues of Christianity.

During California's Gold Rush era, Hope Valley served as a crucial transportation conduit across the Sierra Nevada. It carried the initial route of the California Trail through the eastern slopes of the Sierras, as well as the initial route of the Pony Express. It was also part of the route used by the famous Snowshoe Thompson.

In the early 20th century, a proposal was studied to dam the valley in order to form a reservoir. This proposal, however, was never carried out.

==Conservation==

Hope Valley is part of the Carson Ranger District of Humboldt–Toiyabe National Forest. With the exception of a few scattered inholdings, the entire area of Hope Valley is within this national forest. The valley borders Eldorado National Forest at Carson Pass, and the Lake Tahoe Basin Management Unit, a special unit of the U.S. Forest Service, at Luther Pass.

In 1989, the California Department of Fish and Wildlife designated  of valley bottom as Hope Valley Wildlife Area.

See also
West Fork Carson River
Eastern Sierra

References

Sierra Nevada (United States)
Alpine County, California
Landforms of Alpine County, California